The 2000 NHK Trophy was the final event of six in the 2000–01 ISU Grand Prix of Figure Skating, a senior-level international invitational competition series. It was held at the Asahikawa Taisetsu Ice Arena in Asahikawa on November 30 – December 3. Medals were awarded in the disciplines of men's singles, ladies' singles, pair skating, and ice dancing. Skaters earned points toward qualifying for the 2000–01 Grand Prix Final. The compulsory dance was the Rhumba.

Results

Men

Ladies

Pairs

Ice dancing

External links
 2000 NHK Trophy

Nhk Trophy, 2000
NHK Trophy